Ideli Salvatti is a Brazilian politician. She became the first woman to be elected senator of the state of Santa Catarina. She was the Minister of Fisheries and Aquaculture in the Dilma Rousseff Government. She later worked in the Secretariat of Institutional Relations and Secretariat of Human Rights.

Biography
She graduated with a degree in Physics from the University of Paraná .  She married Eurides Mescolotto and had two children and later she married Jeferson Figueiredo in 2009.

References 

|-

|-

|-

1952 births
Living people
21st-century Brazilian women politicians
Government ministers of Brazil
Women government ministers of Brazil
People from São Paulo
Federal University of Paraná alumni